Ingrandes is a commune in the Indre department in central France.  The village is the site of the Gallic city of Pictavorum prior to the Roman Empire's domination of this part of Western Gaul (France).
and called Fines later on in the roman period.
The name Ingrandes comes from gallic Egoranda or Equoranda meaning frontier between regions. There are over 3 Ingrandes in the region, and over 100 towns, villages or locality called Ingrandes or other toponyms.

Geography
The commune is located in the parc naturel régional de la Brenne.

The Salleron forms most of the commune's southeastern border, then flows into the Anglin. The village lies in the middle of the commune, on the right bank of the Anglin, which flows northwest through the commune.

Population

See also
Communes of the Indre department

References

Communes of Indre